Forever is the second English-language album by Danish singer Medina. It was released on 1 June 2012 through EMI. The album consists of ten original songs and three translated songs from her third Danish album, For altid (2011): "Forever", "Happening" and "Black Lights". "Forever" was released as the album's lead single on 13 April 2012.

Singles
The album's title track, "Forever" was released as the album's lead single on 13 April 2012. "Happening" was released as the second single on 14 September 2012. "Boring" was released as the album's first promotional single on 11 May 2012 through iTunes Store and was released as the album's third single under its new title "Boring (It's Too Late)" on 22 February 2013. "Waiting for Love" was released as the third promotional single on 25 May 2012 and was released as the fourth single on 23 May 2013. "Junkie" was released as the fifth single on 20 August 2013. A remix of "Fool (I Feel Bad for You)" was released as the sixth and final single on 21 January 2014.

Promotional singles
"Keep Me Hangin'" was released as the second promotional single on 18 May 2012.

Track listing

Special Edition
The second disc includes all ten tracks from Medina's third Danish studio album, For altid.

Forever 2.0
On 9 October 2012 Medina posted on her official Facebook page that she was working on an English version of "Synd for dig". The re-release will contain five new tracks: "Fool (I Feel Bad for You)", which is the English version of "Synd for dig", "I'm Waiting", "Perfect Drug" and two collaborations, one being "Junkie" a collaboration with Danish producer duo Svenstrup & Vendelboe and a remix of the previous released single "Happening" which features American R&B recording artist Lloyd.

US version
On 10 December 2013 Forever was released in the US by Ultra Records. This release contains fourteen tracks of the album Forever 2.0 and a new track "Afraid", which is the English version of the song "Har du glemt".

Notes
"Forever" is the English version of "For altid".
"Happening" is the English version of "Kl. 10".
"Black Lights" is the English version of "Lyser i mørke".
"Fool (I Feel Bad for You)" is the English version of "Synd for dig".
"I'm Waiting" is the English version of "Jeg venter".
"Perfect Drug" is the English version of "Lykkepille".
"Afraid" is the English version of "Har du glemt".

Charts

Release history

References

2012 albums
Medina (singer) albums